Republic of Korea Army Infantry School is a college located in Jangseong, South Korea.

References

Infantry units and formations
Training establishments of the South Korean Army
Universities and colleges in South Jeolla Province